German submarine U-193 was a Type IXC/40 U-boat of Nazi Germany's Kriegsmarine built during World War II for service in the Atlantic Ocean. 
The submarine was laid down on 22 December 1941 at the AG Weser yard in Bremen as yard number 1039. She was launched on 24 August 1942 and commissioned on 10 December under the command of Korvettenkapitän Hans Paukstadt.

She was a member of two wolfpacks and carried out four war patrols in which she sank one ship, before being lost herself in the Bay of Biscay in April 1944.

Design
German Type IXC/40 submarines were slightly larger than the original Type IXCs. U-193 had a displacement of  when at the surface and  while submerged. She had two shafts and two  propellers.

U-193 was fitted with six  torpedo tubes (four fitted at the bow and two at the stern), 22 torpedoes, one  SK C/32 naval gun, 180 rounds, and a  SK C/30 as well as a  C/30 anti-aircraft gun. The boat had a complement of forty-eight.

Service history

First patrol
The boat's first patrol was preceded by a short trip from Kiel in Germany to Bergen in Norway in May 1943. She then left the Nordic port on 22 May, heading west. She negotiated the gap between Iceland and the Faroe Islands and entered the Atlantic Ocean.

She did not encounter any Allied shipping, and failed to find her first victory. An unidentified aircraft attacked U-193 south of the Canary Islands on 6 July, wounding two men and destroying the Metox radar detection equipment.

The submarine entered Bordeaux in occupied France, on 23 July.

Second and third patrols
U-193s second foray began with her departure from La Pallice, (she had moved there in September), on 12 October 1943. Moving to the Gulf of Mexico, she sank the independently sailing 10,172 GRT American oil tanker Touchet west of Florida with the loss of ten of her crew. The remainder of the patrol was a failure, however, as a combination of dud torpedoes, well-organized convoys and effective counter-measures combined to prevent the boat gaining a single hit.

As the second patrol came to an end in February 1944 after five frustrating months at sea, U-193 caused an international incident following an attack by Allied aircraft and convoy escorts off the Spanish coast. In her desperate attempts to escape, she dived straight into the seabed, causing serious damage to the boat. Knowing a journey to a German-held port was now impossible, her captain, Hans Pauckstadt, decided to intern his boat in Ferrol, Spain. Under international law, if U-193 remained in the neutral harbour for more than 24 hours, then the Spanish authorities were obliged to detain the submarine for the remainder of hostilities. This did not occur, U-193 stayed in Ferrol for ten days whilst Spanish workmen performed superficial repairs to the U-boat.

U-193 then left the port despite Allied protests and returned to La Pallice in France, where more extensive repairs were completed and Paukstadt was replaced by Kptlt. Dr. Ulrich Abel. Abel had served as Watch Officer on  under the command of :de:Oskar Kusch. Abel denounced Kusch, which led to Kusch's court martial and execution for defeatism. This six-day passage is often listed as U-193s 'third' patrol, although there was no intention of operating against Allied shipping.

Fourth patrol
Following repairs, U-193 departed on her fourth and final patrol and was never heard from again. Her loss remains a mystery. A post-war assessment states that on the 28 April 1944, she was seen and attacked by a British Royal Air Force Vickers Wellington bomber of No. 612 Squadron RAF, whose depth charges sank the boat with all 59 hands not far from Nantes. This attack was actually against , inflicting no damage. The reason for U-193 loss is unknown; however as the Bay of Biscay was routinely mined by the RAF, it could have been an operational loss.

Summary of raiding history

References

Bibliography

External links

German Type IX submarines
World War II shipwrecks in the Atlantic Ocean
U-boats commissioned in 1942
1942 ships
U-boats sunk in 1944
World War II submarines of Germany
Missing U-boats of World War II
Ships built in Bremen (state)
U-boats sunk by mines
Maritime incidents in April 1944